Morchella bicostata is a species of fungus in the family Morchellaceae. It is found in southwestern China.

References

External links

Fungi described in 2005
Fungi of China
bicostata